Amanda Pérez may refer to:
 Amanda Perez, American R&B singer-songwriter and record producer
 Amanda Pérez (footballer), American-born Mexican footballer